The Copa del Rey de Hockey Patines is an annual Spanish rink hockey competition which is contested by eight teams. It held every year at a neutral venue. The first eight teams in standings just to half-season take part in Copa del Rey. The Copa del Rey's winners play in the next edition of CERS Cup.

Competition format

Since 1999, the competition is played with a Final Eight format. At the end of the first half of the regular season, the top seven teams from the Spanish League and the host one, if it is not between these teams, qualify for the tournament. The eight teams play a play-off at one venue, over four days, eventually producing a winner.

Champions by year

Performance by club

Champions by Autonomous Communities

See also
OK Liga
Supercopa de España de Hockey Patines

References

External links
FEP web site
Copa del Rey at hoqueipatins.cat

Roller hockey competitions in Spain
Recurring sporting events established in 1944